The Slovakia women's national basketball team represents Slovakia in international women's basketball, and is run by the Slovak Basketball Association. Slovakia are one of the newest national basketball teams in the world, having split from  Czechoslovakia after the dissolution of the unified state in 1993, with the Slovakia women's national basketball team continuing as the successor state of Czechoslovakia.

History
Before 1993, Slovak players represented Czechoslovakia. When Slovakia became independent, it became the successor state to the Czechoslovakia and, therefore, the results of previous state rightfully belong to it.

In the 1990s, the Slovaks were the most successful women's basketball team in Europe, and thanks to that they became the most successful team sport in the country. This position was confirmed at the 1994 Women's Basketball World Cup, where they placed fifth; at the 1998 Women's Basketball World Cup, they were eighth. 

The team won a bronze medal during the 1993 European Championship and a silver medal during the 1997 European Championship.

The only Olympic start in the Sydney 2000 was marked by the resignation of the implementation team led by Natália Hejková before the Olympics after disagreements with the leadership of the SBA. 

After 2001, there was a withdrawal from the positions, which culminated in non – participation in the EuroBasket Women 2005 and EuroBasket Women 2007. The biggest successes of the last period is 8th place from the European Championships 2009 and 2017.

In the qualification for EuroBasket Women 2019, the team did not succeed and finished in third place in the group. Following the failure, the national team coach Peter Kováčik resigned and was replaced from February 2019 by Juraj Suja.

After the victory over Netherlands on 6 February 2021 in Piešťany 61:50, Slovaks won qualification group H and advanced to EuroBasket Women 2021.

Competitive record

Olympic Games

FIBA Women's World Cup

EuroBasket Women

Team

Current roster
Roster for the EuroBasket Women 2021.

Head coaches
 Marián Matyáš – (1993–1995)
 Tibor Vasiľko – (1996–1997)
 Natália Hejková – (1998 – 15 July 2000)
 Ľubomír Doušek – (2000)
 Marián Matyáš – (2001 – October 2001)
 Peter Kováčik – (October 2001 – 2003)
 Maroš Guzikiewicz – (2004)
 Jozef Rešetár – (2004–2005)
 Vladimír Karnay – (2006–2007)
 Pokey Chatman – (2008–2010)
 Natália Hejková – (2011)
 Ivan Vojtko – (5 March 2012 – 30 September 2013)
 Maroš Kováčik – (30 September 2013 – 27 April 2017)
 Marián Svoboda – (27 April 2017 – 26 October 2017)
 Peter Kováčik – (27 October 2017 – November 2018)
 Juraj Suja – (22 February 2019 – present)

See also
Slovakia women's national under-20 basketball team
Slovakia women's national under-18 basketball team
Slovakia women's national under-16 basketball team

References

External links
 
FIBA profile
Slovakia National Team – Women at Eurobasket.com

 
 
Women's national basketball teams